As of 2019, there were eight Ministry of Public Health hospitals in Guinea-Bissau.

References

Hospitals in Guinea-Bissau
Guinea-Bissau
Guinea-Bissau
Hospitals